Bakoko may refer to:

Bakoko people or Basoo, an ethnic group in Cameroon
Bakoko language or Kogo, a Basaa Bantu language of Cameroon
Bakoko dialect or Koko, a dialect of Oroko, a Sawabantu Bantu language of Cameroon
Bakoko, the local Cuyonon name for the Philippine forest turtle